The 2013–14 Bahrain First Division League is the 57th edition of top level football in Bahrain. Busaiteen Club are the defending champions. The season started on 15 September.

Teams
Bahrain Club was relegated from the  2012–13 league campaign and replaced by Sitra who were last in the top flight in the 2008–09 league season. Malkiya survived the end of season playoff against East Riffa 2:1 on aggregate

Stadia and locations

Although most clubs have a stadium, all games are played at the National Stadium, Khalifa Sports City Stadium and Al Ahli Stadium in. Games are usually played as back to back headers.

League table

References

Bahraini Premier League seasons
1
Bah